Thomas Hunter may refer to:

Politics
 Thomas Hunter (New York politician) (1834–1903), New York politician
 Thomas Hunter (Irish politician) (1883–1932), Sinn Féin politician in the First Dáil and Second Dáil
 Thomas Hunter (Scottish politician) (1872–1953), MP for Perth, 1935–1945

Sports
 Thomas Hunter (soccer) (born 1988), American soccer player
 Thomas John Hunter (1881–1928), Scottish football defender
 Tom Hunter (coach) (born 1990/1991), Australian rules football coach
 Tom Hunter (golfer) (1843–?), Scottish golfer
 Tom Hunter (lacrosse), American lacrosse player
 Tommy Hunter (baseball) (born 1986), American baseball pitcher
 Tommy Hunter (footballer) (1863–1918), footballer for Wolverhampton Wanderers

Music
 Tommy Hunter (fiddler) (1919–1993), North Carolina fiddler
 Tom Hunter (singer) (1946–2008), American folk singer
 Tommy Hunter (born 1937), Canadian country music singer

Films
 T. Hayes Hunter (Thomas Hayes Hunter, 1884–1944), American film director
 Thomas Hunter (actor) (1932–2017), American actor who appeared in several Italian films

Other
 Thomas Hunter (school founder) (1831–1915), founder of Hunter College in New York
 Thomas Hunter (dentist) (1863–1958), New Zealand dentist and public health administrator
 Thomas Hunter (psychologist) (1876–1953), British psychologist
 Thomas Hunter (RFC officer) (1897–1917), World War I flying ace
 Tom Hunter (VC) (1923–1945), recipient of the Victoria Cross
 Sir Tom Hunter (born 1961), Scottish entrepreneur and philanthropist
 Tom Hunter (artist) (born 1965), photographer
 Thomas Hunter, fictional protagonist of Ted Dekker's Circle Trilogy